Henry Dawson (1811–1878) was a British landscape painter.

Born in Kingston upon Hull, Dawson went with his parents to Nottingham when he was still an infant and always regarded the latter as his native town. His parents were poor, and he began life in a Nottingham lace factory. But even while engaged in lace-making he continued to find time for art, and used to paint small pictures, which he sold at first for about half-a-crown each. In 1835 he gave up the lace trade and set up as an artist, his earliest patron being a hairdresser in Nottingham, who possessed a taste for art. In 1844 he removed to Liverpool, where after a time he got into greater repute, and received higher prices for his works. In 1849 he came with his family to London, and settled at Croydon, where some of his best pictures were painted. Among these may be reckoned 'The Wooden Walls of Old England,' exhibited at the British Institution in 1853, 'The Rainbow,' 'The Rainbow at Sea,' 'London Bridge,' and ' London at Sunrise.'

With the exception of six lessons from Pyne received in 1838, Henry Dawson was entirely a self-taught artist, and his art shows much originality and careful realism. He studied nature for himself, but he seems in later life to have been moved by Turner's influence to try more brilliant effects than he had before dared. Many of his works indeed are very Turneresque in treatment, though he can scarcely be called an imitator of Turner, for he had a distinct style of his own.

Henry Dawson, though painting much, and selling his pictures for high prices in his later life, remained, strange to say, very little known except to artists and connoisseurs until the large and very interesting collection of his works that was made for the Nottingham Exhibition in 1878 brought him wider fame. This exhibition showed him to be a genuine English landscape painter, of no great imaginative or intellectual power, but who delighted in nature, and represented her faithfully to the best of his ability. He died in December 1878, at Chiswick, where he had for some time resided.

References

External links
 

1811 births
1878 deaths
English landscape painters
Artists from Kingston upon Hull
Artists from Nottingham
19th-century English painters
English male painters
19th-century English male artists